Depois do Adeus is a Portuguese historical drama series set in the mid 1970s.

Cast
Ana Nave 
José Carlos Garcia
Diogo Infante
Ana Padrão
João Reis

References

External links

2013 Portuguese television series debuts
Television series set in the 1970s
Rádio e Televisão de Portugal original programming
2010s Portuguese television series